ひとつ空の下 (Under the Same Sky) is a studio album by Korean singer Younha, released on September 22, 2010. Single release song, "memory", "end of the rainbow" was distributed release in the album. i-dep, Sotte Bosse Hiroshi Nakamura playing as a duo, acoustic guitar and popular participation DEPAPEPE.

Track listing
 Wind
 Tomatoes sun ("SOLiVE24" of  official support song)
 I like - Sukinanda (Kanagawa "saku saku" ED Theme)
 What is goodbye? (Depapepe Younha song collaboration)
 Soratomo - look up at the sky ("SOLiVE24" official support song )
 Girl (TV Asahi, "Beat Takeshi's TV Tackle" ED Theme)
 Complicated
 Daily Daily
 Remember(記憶, lit. "Memory" transliterated as kioku) (JapaneseTV  anime series "RIDEBACK" ED Theme)
 Hold Your Hand
 End of the rainbow (the movie "On Next Sunday" theme song.)
 All lies

Notes

External links 
 Younha Official Korean Website
 Younha Official Japanese Website

2010 albums
Younha albums